Augustynolophus is an extinct genus of herbivorous saurolophine hadrosaur dinosaur which was discovered in the Moreno Formation in California, dating to the late Maastrichtian age, making it one of the last dinosaurs known from the fossil record before the Cretaceous–Paleogene extinction event.

History of discovery

The generic name derives from a combination of the Augustyn family, who helped support the Los Angeles County Museum, and the suffix "-lophus," referring to its relation to Saurolophus. The specific name refers to palaeontologist William Morris. It was originally described as a species of Saurolophus, S. morrisi. However, when a more in-depth study took place, the end results revealed that its cranial structure was vastly different when it was juxtaposed with the other known members of the tribe Saurolophini, most notably Saurolophus osborni and Saurolophus angustirostris and Prosaurolophus maximus and therefore, it was determined to be a separate genus.

All known specimens of Augustynolophus have been found only in California, which was a part of Laramidia, among the best locations for dinosaur fossils. There are currently two known specimens of Augustynolophus. The holotype, LACM/CIT 2852, was unearthed in 1943. It consisted of the majority of the skull (including the dentary and predentary), vertebrae, and bones of the limb and hand. The second specimen was designated LACM/CIT 2760. Discovered in 1939, it was made up of elements of the skull and limbs. Due to its smaller size, it may have been a juvenile. It is one of three known dinosaurs from western coast of the United States, the other three being the Campanian Aletopelta coombsi, the sea bird Ichthyornis, and an undescribed species of tyrannosaur from Washington state informally named Suciasaurus rex. However, indeterminate hadrosaur and ornithopod remains have been found throughout California and similar areas as far back as the 1930s.

In September 2017, Augustynolophus was declared the official state dinosaur of California.

Description
 
Like all species of hadrosaur, Augustynolophus morrisi was a herbivorous dinosaur which had a diet consisting of the plant life in the area, it was specialized to chew its food since hadrosaurs were one of the few known species of dinosaur that chewed its food.

Paleoecology
 
Very is little is known about the fauna found in the coastal states of Laramida, which is a stark similarity to the neighboring island continent of Appalachia which was on the opposite side of the Western Interior Seaway. The western United States has a rich history of rich fossil finds, most notable examples include the Hell Creek Formation and the Two Medicine Formation. However, like with Appalachia, the land fauna of western Laramidia, most notably the dinosaurs, is not well studied and are not well known.

However, despite the fact that dinosaur fossils are rare in California, the Moreno Formation is one of the more well studied Mesozoic geological formations in California and like Appalachia, it is more well known for the large amount of marine fossils. Augustynolophus shared its environment with a wide variety of marine creatures which consisted of non-marine turtles, mosasaurs, plesiosaurs and ray-finned fish. The turtles that lived in this region included Basilemys and Osteopygis. Mosasaurs were very common in this region and 4 species have been unearthed from this fossil formation. They include Prognathodon, Halisaurus, Plesiotylosaurus, and Plotosaurus.  Plesiosaurs that inhabited the Moreno Formation consisted of 4 genera: Frensosaurus, Morenosaurus, Aphrosaurus, and Hydrotherosaurus. Bonnerichthys and Saurodon were the only ray-finned fish found here.

See also
 Timeline of hadrosaur research
 List of California state symbols

References

Late Cretaceous dinosaurs of North America
Saurolophines
Fossil taxa described in 2014
Taxa named by Luis M. Chiappe
Paleontology in California
Symbols of California
Ornithischian genera